Toxicology is a peer-reviewed scientific journal covering the adverse effects of xenobiotics on the health of humans and other animals. It is affiliated with the German Toxicology Society.

Abstracting and indexing 
The journal is abstracted and indexed in BIOSIS Previews, Cambridge Scientific Abstracts, Chemical Abstracts, Current Contents/Life Sciences, EMBASE, MEDLINE, PASCAL, Science Citation Index, and Scopus. According to the Journal Citation Reports, the journal has a 2020 impact factor of 4.221.

References

External links 
 

Elsevier academic journals
Publications established in 1973
English-language journals
Toxicology journals
Journals published between 27 and 51 times per year